Diário da Lexa is a Brazilian television documentary series 
of his career and the life of the singer Lexa, The series debuted on July 26, 2015, on the MTV network.

Production 
Lexa started on your YouTube channel, a series of videos, which she called Diario da Lexa. The webseries will show the fans, career behind the scenes of the singer, as studio recordings, film covers videos, test for the shows, among other times working the new darling of the funk.

Episodes

External links 
 

Brazilian television series
Lexa (singer)